My Little Pony is an entertainment franchise developed by Hasbro.

My Little Pony may also refer to:

Film 
 My Little Pony: The Movie (1986 film), a 1986 animated film
 My Little Pony: The Movie (2017 film), a 2017 animated film
 My Little Pony: A New Generation, a 2021 animated film

Print media 
 My Little Pony (Egmont comics), a British series of comics published by Egmont between 1985 and 1994
 My Little Pony (IDW Publishing), an American group of comic book series issued by IDW Publishing since 2012

Television 
 My Little Pony (TV series), an American animated television series which debuted in 1986
 My Little Pony Tales, an American animated television series which ran in 1992
 My Little Pony: Friendship Is Magic, an animated television series which debuted in 2010
 My Little Pony: Pony Life is an animated television series which debuted in 2020

Toyline
 My Little Pony (1982 toyline)
 My Little Pony (2003 toyline)
 My Little Pony (2010 toyline)
 My Little Pony: Equestria Girls, a spin-off franchise which debuted in 2013

See also 
 My Little Pony: Equestria Girls (disambiguation)
 My Little Puny, Dutch drag queen